The Semmelweis reflex or "Semmelweis effect" is a metaphor for the reflex-like tendency to reject new evidence or new knowledge because it contradicts established norms, beliefs, or paradigms.

The term derives from the name of Ignaz Semmelweis, a Hungarian physician who discovered in 1847 that childbed fever mortality rates fell ten-fold when doctors disinfected their hands with a chlorine solution before moving from one patient to another, or, most particularly, after an autopsy. (At one of the two maternity wards at the university hospital where Semmelweis worked, physicians performed autopsies on every deceased patient.) Semmelweis's procedure saved many lives by stopping the ongoing contamination of patients (mostly pregnant women) with what he termed "cadaverous particles", twenty years before germ theory was discovered. Despite the overwhelming empirical evidence, his fellow doctors rejected his hand-washing suggestions, often for non-medical reasons. For instance, some doctors refused to believe that a gentleman's hands could transmit disease.

While there is uncertainty regarding its origin and generally accepted use, the expression "Semmelweis Reflex" had been used by the author Robert Anton Wilson. In Wilson's book The Game of Life, Timothy Leary provided the following polemical definition of the Semmelweis reflex: "Mob behavior found among primates and larval hominids on undeveloped planets, in which a discovery of important scientific fact is punished".

In the preface to the fiftieth anniversary edition of his book The Myth of Mental Illness, Thomas Szasz says that Semmelweis's biography impressed upon him at a young age, a "deep sense of the invincible social power of false truths."

See also

 Belief perseverance
 Cognitive dissonance
 Confirmation bias
 Conservatism (belief revision)
 Galileo gambit
 Not invented here
 Paradigm shift

References

Ignaz Semmelweis
Cognitive inertia
English phrases